Earl Sylvester Coe (1892 – May 23, 1964) was an American politician who served as the ninth Secretary of State of Washington. Coe previously served as a member of the Washington State Legislature.

Early life 
Coe was born and raised in Minneapolis, Minnesota.

Career 
In 1913, he relocated to Bingen, Washington, where he worked in the shipping and lumber business.

In 1938, he was elected to the Washington House of Representatives. In 1944, he was elected to the Washington State Senate. He was also an unsuccessful candidate for the United States House of Representatives in 1946. From 1946 to 1948, he served as the chair of the Washington State Democratic Party. He was a Democratic candidate for the 1956 Washington gubernatorial election, losing to Albert Rosellini. When Rosellini was elected governor, he appointed Coe to serve as secretary of state. He served from 1948 to 1957. He later served as the director of the Washington Department of Conservation.

Death 
Coe died in Olympia, Washington in 1964.

References 

1892 births
1964 deaths
People from Minneapolis
Democratic Party members of the Washington House of Representatives
Democratic Party Washington (state) state senators
Secretaries of State of Washington (state)
20th-century American politicians